Itzcoatl ("Obsidian Serpent") (1380–1440) was the fourth king of Tenochtitlan, and the founder of the Aztec Empire, ruling from 1427 to 1440. Under Itzcoatl the Mexica of Tenochtitlan threw off the domination of the Tepanecs and established the Triple Alliance (Aztec Empire) together with the other city-states Tetzcoco and Tlacopan.

Biography 
Itzcoatl was the natural son of tlàtoāni Acamapichtli and an unknown Tepanec woman from Azcapotzalco. He was elected as the king when his predecessor, his nephew Chimalpopoca, was killed by Maxtla of the nearby Tepanec āltepētl (city-state) of Azcapotzalco. Allying  with Nezahualcoyotl of Texcoco, Itzcoatl went on to defeat Maxtla and end the Tepanec domination of central Mexico.

After this victory, Itzcoatl, Nezahualcoyotl, and Totoquilhuaztli, king of Tlacopan, forged what would become known as the Aztec Triple Alliance, forming the basis of the eventual Aztec Empire.

Itzcoatl next turned his attention to the chinampas districts on the south shores of Lakes Xochimilco and Chalco. Fresh water springs lining these shores had allowed the development of extensive raised gardens, or chinampas, set on the shallow lake floors. Successful campaigns against Xochimilco (1430), Mixquic (1432), Cuitlahuac (1433), and Tezompa would secure agricultural resources for Tenochtitlan and, along with the conquest of Culhuacan and Coyoacán, would cement the Triple Alliance's control over the southern half of the Valley of Mexico.

With this string of victories, Itzcoatl took the title Culhua teuctli, "Lord of the Culhua" while Totoquilhuaztli, king of Tlacopan, took the title Tepaneca teuctli, "Lord of the Tepanecs".

In 1439, Itzcoatl undertook a campaign outside the Valley of Mexico against Cuauhnahuac (Cuernavaca).

According to the Florentine Codex, Itzcoatl ordered the burning of all historical codices because it was "not wise that all the people should know the paintings". Among other purposes, this allowed the Aztec state to develop a state-sanctioned history and mythos that venerated Huitzilopochtli.

Itzcoatl also continued the building of Tenochtitlan: during his reign temples, roads, and a causeway were built. Itzcoatl established the religious and governmental hierarchy that was assumed by his nephew Moctezuma I upon his death in 1440.

In January 2021 the INAH proposed moving the statues of Ahuizotl and Itzcóatl, known as the Indios Verdes, from the Parque del Mestizaje in Gustavo A. Madero, Mexico City to the Paseo de la Reforma. “The transfer means a reading of the urban space, recovering the historical discourse that gave rise to the formation of a set of monuments and roundabouts on Paseo de la Reforma, conceived at the end of the 19th century, with the idea of honoring the Reformation, a great transformation that it meant for Mexico, but to recover a historical reading that began precisely by underlining the Mexican splendor and the importance of the pre-Hispanic or Mesoamerican antecedents of our country ”, Diego Prieto, director of INAH said.

Family 
Itzcoatl was a son of Acamapichtli and half-brother of Huitzilihuitl. He was an uncle of Chimalpopoca and Moctezuma I.

He married princess Huacaltzintli and had a son Tezozomoc

See also 

List of Tenochtitlan rulers
 History of the Aztecs

Notes

References

External links

 

Tenochca tlatoque
15th-century monarchs in North America
15th-century indigenous people of the Americas
15th century in the Aztec civilization
1380 births
1440 deaths
Book burnings